

353001–353100 

|-bgcolor=#f2f2f2
| colspan=4 align=center | 
|}

353101–353200 

|-id=189
| 353189 Iasus ||  || Iasus, a Greek hero in the Trojan War. A leader of the Athenians and the son of Sphelus. || 
|}

353201–353300 

|-id=232
| 353232 Nolwenn ||  || Nolwenn Leroy (born 1982), a French singer and songwriter. || 
|}

353301–353400 

|-bgcolor=#f2f2f2
| colspan=4 align=center | 
|}

353401–353500 

|-id=404
| 353404 Laugalys ||  || Vygandas Laugalys (born 1972), Lithuanian astronomer, is an expert in Galactic structure and stellar photometry. He is known as a hunter of asteroids and together with K. Černis, he discovered the first asteroid from Lithuania in 2001. He is the author of more than 40 scientific papers. || 
|}

353501–353600 

|-id=577
| 353577 Gediminas ||  || Gediminas (1275–1341), Grand Duke of Lithuania from 1315 until his death. || 
|-id=595
| 353595 Grancanaria ||  || Gran Canaria, Spain, an island located in the Atlantic Ocean, is the most populated of the Canary Islands. || 
|}

353601–353700 

|-bgcolor=#f2f2f2
| colspan=4 align=center | 
|}

353701–353800 

|-bgcolor=#f2f2f2
| colspan=4 align=center | 
|}

353801–353900 

|-bgcolor=#f2f2f2
| colspan=4 align=center | 
|}

353901–354000 

|-bgcolor=#f2f2f2
| colspan=4 align=center | 
|}

References 

353001-354000